The Blank Generation (1976) is the earliest of the released DIY "home movies" of the 1970s punk rock scene in  New York City. It was filmed by No Wave filmmaker Amos Poe and Patti Smith Group member Ivan Kral.

Synopsis 
Directors and producers Kral and Poe filmed behind-the-scenes and on- and offstage footage of punk musicians before they became icons. The project stemmed from Kral's visual diary of his experiences in New York, filming bandmates and friends with a 16mm camera.

The film includes footage of Blondie, Patti Smith, The Ramones, Television, Talking Heads, New York Dolls, The Heartbreakers, The Shirts, and Robert Gordon (then with Tuff Darts).

Production
The action is centered on the music scene in New York clubs including CBGB and Max's Kansas City. Film locations also include the Hotel Chelsea, The Bottom Line, and other spots in the Bowery and Lower East Side neighborhoods. Legal disputes between Poe and Kral ultimately resulted in the removal of Poe's name from the credits once Kral asserted copyright to the film years after its initial release.

Reception
Dave Kehr of The Chicago Reader called the film "New wave's answer to The T.A.M.I. Show". while Time Out New York put it at #89 on their list of the 100 Best NY Movies.

Cast 
 Richard Hell
 Patti Smith Group
 Television
 Ramones
 The Heartbreakers
 Talking Heads
 Blondie
 Tuff Darts
 New York Dolls
 The Shirts

Musicians featured in the film include: Clem Burke, David Byrne, Jayne County,  Wayne County, Jay Dee Daugherty, Jimmy Destri, Billy Ficca, Chris Frantz, Annie Golden, Robert Gordon, Debbie Harry, Richard Hell, David Johansen, Arthur Kane, Lenny Kaye, Ivan Kral, Richard Lloyd, Walter Lure, Lizzy Mercier Descloux, Jerry Nolan, Dee Dee Ramone, Joey Ramone, Johnny Ramone, Tommy Ramone, Jeff Salen (Tuff Darts), Fred Smith, Patti Smith, Richard Sohl, Chris Stein, Syl Sylvain, Johnny Thunders, Gary Valentine, Tom Verlaine and Tina Weymouth; as well as CBGB owner Hilly Kristal and others.

See also
Rock 'n' Roll High School -- 1979 film starring The Ramones
Stop Making Sense -- 1984 concert film featuring The Talking Heads
True Stories -- 1986 comedy film directed by David Byrne
Blank City -- 2010 documentary about No Wave filmmakers and artists in 1980s New York
Experimental film
Jean-Luc Godard -- inspiration for this film

References

External links 
 
 
 
The BLANK generation Film fan page

1976 films
American documentary films
Documentary films about punk music and musicians
Black-and-white documentary films
Punk films
Films shot in New York City
Films without speech
American independent films
Music of New York City
1976 documentary films
American black-and-white films
1970s English-language films
1970s American films